Karl Josef Bernhard von Neher (16 January 1806, in Biberach an der Riß – 17 January 1886, in Stuttgart) was a German painter.

Life and work
Neher began to study painting in 1822 in Stuttgart, under Johann Heinrich von Dannecker und Philipp Friedrich von Hetsch, but received his primary instruction at the Academy of Fine Arts Munich with Peter von Cornelius. This was followed by four years in Rome, where he cultivated contacts with the Nazarene movement, led by Friedrich Overbeck und Philipp Veit. In 1832, he returned to Munich, where he painted the huge fresco that adorns the arch of the Isartor, depicting the triumphal entry of Emperor Louis after his victory at the Battle of Mühldorf.

In 1836 he was summoned to Weimar, to decorate two rooms of the Grand Ducal Palace with murals. He worked there, off and on, for eleven years. In 1841, he became Director of the Academy of Visual Arts in Leipzig. He was later induced to return to Stuttgart, where he became a Professor at the Royal Art School. He was promoted to Director in 1854, but continued to produce many large oil paintings, mostly on religious subjects.

Arguably, however, his best work involved a series of large glass paintings for stained-glass windows; six for the Stiftskirche, three for the chapel in the Old Castle and one each for the Leonhardskirche, the Greek Chapel in the New Castle and the Johanneskirche.

In 1852, he was awarded the Knight's Cross, First Class of the Order of the Crown (Württemberg), which conferred a title of nobility. In 1878, The Staatsgalerie Stuttgart acquired the frames and designs for his windows. He resigned his position as Director in 1879.

References

Sources 
  Ulrike Gauss, Kurt Löcher: Karl Joseph Bernhard von Neher 1806 - 1886 (Katalog u. Einf.), Aquarelle und Zeichnungen, 1971, Biberacher Verlagsdruckerei, Exhibition of 29 August - 3 October 1971

External links 

 
 Bernhard von Neher - Der Maler der Königinnen und Könige
 Matrikeleintrag der Akademie der Bildenden Künste München

1806 births
1886 deaths
People from Biberach an der Riss
German male painters
German stained glass artists and manufacturers
Religious artists
19th-century German painters
19th-century German male artists